"Stardust" is an instrumental composition by French composer and producer Jean-Michel Jarre in collaboration with Dutch disc jockey and producer Armin van Buuren. It was released on 31 July 2015 as digital download by Columbia Records as the fifth single from Jarre's seventeenth studio album, Electronica 1: The Time Machine.

Background and release 
Jean-Michel Jarre has been Armin van Buuren's musical idol during its childhood. Van Buuren's music is often inspired by Jarre's productions. Jarre declared about the track : “I also think that this track is conveying both our identities”.

Their collaboration was revealed during van Buuren's performance at Tomorrowland 2015 in Belgium.

Critical review 
Tim Olsson from webmedia We Rave You noticed that "The track includes the perfect blend of both artists’ personal sounds, which was also an important goal for the track." Bulbi from French webmedia Guettapen asserted that "the result is an absolutely superb uplifting trance track. The kind of sounds which send you to the stars. It should be listened with eyes closed".

Track listing 
France - Digital download - Columbia
 "Stardust" – 4:38

Digital download 
 "Stardust" (Rising Star Remix) - 5:42

Charts

References 

2015 songs
2015 singles
Armin van Buuren songs
Songs written by Armin van Buuren
Columbia Records singles